Awak may refer to:

Awak language
Awak Kuier
Hussam Awak
Pisang Awak banana
AWAK